eMbalenhle is a township in Govan Mbeki Local Municipality in the Mpumalanga province of South Africa.

It was established in the 1970s to serve as a black-only township for the neighbouring Secunda, which was founded at the same time. Similar to Secunda, a substantial part of housing in eMbalenhle has been constructed by Sasol for its workers.

eMbalenhle is 10 km away from Secunda, and either town is generally accessed from the other by means of using the R580 road.

References

Populated places in the Govan Mbeki Local Municipality
Townships in Mpumalanga